Barasat is a city and a municipality of North 24 Parganas district in the state of West Bengal, India. It is the headquarters of Barasat Sadar subdivision. It is a part of the area covered by Kolkata Metropolitan Development Authority (KMDA). Located in the Ganges delta, Barasat is a regional transportation hub as a rail and road junction. National Highway 12 (formerly NH 34/ Krishnanagar Road towards North Bengal), NH 112 (formerly NH 35/ Jessore Road, leading to the Bangladesh border at Petrapole), Taki Road and Barrackpore-Barasat Road (both are part of SH 2) are the main connectivity links to the city.

History
During the Mughal Empire period, Sankar Chakraborty (a commander of the zamindar Pratapaditya and king of Jessore in present-day Bangladesh) came to Barasat, Kolkata in 1600 and established himself. In 1700, Hazarat Ekdil Shah moved to the town and was known as a social reformer. His tomb, in Kazipara, is a pilgrimage site for the Muslim community. Pratapaditya made his way to Kolkata from Jessore; Sirajudullah went to Kolkata from Murshidabad via Barasat on a road which became two national highways.

Under the British Raj, East India Company officials from Calcutta (Kolkata) made Barasat a weekend retreat and built houses with gardens. Warren Hastings built his villa in the heart of Barasat and Bankim Chandra Chatterjee was the town's first Indian deputy magistrate.

Indigo cultivation was a major industry and indigo merchants were known for their inhumane treatment of farmers. Titumir, a farmer, fomented a revolution against indigo merchants in Barasat. Iswar Chandra Vidyasagar, Pyari Charan Sarkar and Kalikrishna Mitra were known for social reformation in the town, including women's education and widow remarriage. During the early nineteenth century, Barasat Cadet College trained new recruits and cadets from Europe; the college closed in 1811.

From 1834 to 1861, Barasat was the seat of Barasat District. The district became a subdivision of the Twenty-four Parganas district in 1861, and Barasat is the headquarters of North 24 Parganas district.

Geography

Location
Barasat is located in eastern India's Ganges Delta.

Area overview
The area covered in the map alongside is largely a part of the north Bidyadhari Plain. located in the lower Ganges Delta. The area is flat. It is a little raised above flood level and the highest ground borders the river channels. 54.67% of the people of the densely populated area lives in the urban areas and 45.33% lives in the rural  areas.

Note: The map alongside presents some of the notable locations in the subdivision. All places marked in the map are linked in the larger full screen map.

Climate
Barasat has a tropical climate similar to the rest West Bengal. The region experiences a monsoon from early June to mid-September. The climate is dry in winter (mid-November to mid-February) and humid in summer. January is the coldest month and May is the hottest month in Barasat. Months of July and August produces most rainfall in Barasat.

Barasat has a tropical climate similar to the rest West Bengal. The region experiences a monsoon from early June to mid-September. The climate is dry in winter (mid-November to mid-February) and humid in summer. January is the coldest month and May is the hottest month in Barasat. Months of July and August produces most rainfall in Barasat.

Demographics
According to the 2011 Indian census, Barasat had a total population of 278,435; 140,822 (51%) were males and 137,613 (49%) females, and 22,605 were under age six. The literacy rate was 89.62 percent of the population over age six (229,279 people). The town's population increased from 231,521 in 2001. The literacy rate that year was 76 percent, higher than the national average of 54.5 percent. Of the literate population, 52 percent were male and 48 percent female. Barasat was part of the Kolkata Urban Agglomeration in the 2011 census. In Barasat, 87% people are Hindus, 12% are Muslims and 1% people are from other religions (Christianity, Sikhism, Buddhism, Jainism etc.).

Economy
Cotton weaving is Barasat's major industry, and the town is a trade centre for rice, legumes, sugarcane, potatoes, and coconuts. Now it is becoming a shopping destination with various malls including all major brands and multiplexes.

About 32,00,000 people commute daily from around the city to Barasat. Fifty-eight trains transport commuters from 24 stations in the town's Sealdah-Bangaon section and 32 trains carry commuters from 30 stations in the Seadah-Hasnabad section.

Administration

Although Barasat Municipality was established on 1 April 1869, it had no independent existence until 1882. It was controlled by the magistrate office (and its magistrate), without a chairman. In 1882, Barasat Municipality was formed and a local government was created. Barasat Association, a citizen organization, donated land for the construction of municipal buildings.

Barasat is divided into 29 mouzas. There were originally four wards, later increasing to 18. After surrounding panchayats were incorporated in 1995, the number of wards increased to 32. In 2015, before the municipal election, the number of wards increased to 35.
Barasat is part of the Kolkata Metropolitan Area, for which the KMDA is the statutory planning and development authority. The KMDA manages the area's infrastructure development.

The district court handles local and national cases. There are two police outposts (in Barasat and Badu), and a women's police station (in KNC Road, near Barasat Govt College)  in the town.

Zilla Parishad (district council)
The Zilla Parishad of North 24 Parganas was founded on 26 June 1986, with the north–south bifurcation of the 24 Parganas district. The highest tier of the three-tier panchayati raj system, its headquarters are at Barasat. It has six riverine panchayat samitis in the Sundarbans, which has a saline tract on one side and rich alluvial tracts of the Ichamati River basin and industrial belt of Barrackpore on the other side. Its territory extends on the east to the Bangladesh border.

Notable residents

Bankim Chandra Chattopadhyay was the deputy magistrate of 24 Parganas during the 19th century. Graves Haughton became a cadet in 1808, and received his first commission on 13 March 1810 from Barasat cadet institution. Haughton was fluent in Indian (Hindustani) languages, and received the sword of merit and a monetary award from the Barasat institution. He studied regional languages at the College of Fort William in Calcutta, receiving seven medals, three degrees of honor and monetary awards for proficiency in Arabic, Persian, Hindustani (Hindi), Sanskrit and Bengali. Haughton was a lieutenant, a noted orientalist, a Knight of The Royal Guelphic Order, a member of the Asiatic Society and a published author.

References

External links

 
 Census 2001 data

 
Cities and towns in North 24 Parganas district
Kolkata Metropolitan Area
Neighbourhoods in Kolkata
Cities in West Bengal